Marc-Uwe Kling (born 1982) is a German songwriter, author, and Kabarett (political stand-up comedy) artist. He studied philosophy and drama at Freie Universität Berlin.

Since 2003, Kling regularly performs on various stages in Berlin. Frequently, he performs at literary and Kabarett events as well as poetry slams. In 2004, he founded a serial public literary event called Lesedüne (a pun made of the German words Lesebühne, "lecture stage", and Düne, "dune"). Since 2005, Kling tours with his program Wenn alle Stricke reißen, kann man sich nicht mal mehr aufhängen (If all ropes snap, you can't even hang yourself anymore), which is also the title of his first album. Every first Tuesday of the month, he organizes and hosts the Kreuzberg Slam in the Lido (formerly Kato) location, and every first Wednesday the Poetry Slam of Studentisches Kulturzentrum in Potsdam.

Kling hosts the weekly podcast Neues vom Känguru ("News from the Kangaroo") for Fritz, a Potsdam-based radio station, which deals with the same theme as his book Die Känguru-Chroniken (The Kangaroo Chronicles): A "phlegmatic anarchist" who lives with a talking, "pragmatically communist" kangaroo as his roommate.

In 2017, Kling published a comedic dystopian novel titled QualityLand.
In March 2019, HBO announced that they would create a series based on the book, directed by Mike Judge.

Publications

Books

The Kangaroo Chronicles (German: Die Känguru-Chroniken)
 , 272 pp
 
 , 304 pp
 , 400 pp
 , 208 pp
 , 976 pp
 , 1184 pp

Die Känguru-Comics

QualityLand

QualityLand Comics
 , with Zachary Tallent
 , 176 pp, with Zachary Tallen

Children's books
  illustrations by Astrid Henn, 36 pp
 
  illustrations by Astrid Henn, 48 pp
  illustrations by Astrid Henn, 54 pp

Der Tag, an dem... series
  illustrations by Astrid Henn.
 illustrations by Astrid Henn.
  illustrations by Astrid Henn.
  illustrations by Astrid Henn.

Calendars

Anthologies (selection)

Audio (selection)

Die Känguru-Chroniken

QualityLand

Children's books

Others

Games

Die Känguru-Chroniken
 Halt mal kurz!, card game, Kosmos 2016, EAN 4002051740382.
 Game of Quotes, card game, Kosmos 2017, EAN 4002051692926.
 More Game of Quotes card game, Kosmos-Verlag 2019.
 EXIT. Das Spiel: Die Känguru-Eskapaden (with Inka and Markus Brand), Kosmos 2019, EAN 4002051695071.
 Die Würfel-WG, Gesellschaftsspiel (Autors: Johannes Krenner, Alexander Pfister), Kosmos 2019, EAN 4002051693176.
 Voll auf die 18, card game, Pegasus Spiele 2022, EAN 4250231734366.

Others
 Quiztopia, board games (with Maria Kling), Kosmos 2019, EAN 4002051694296.
 Das NEINhorn, card game, Kosmos 2021, EAN 4002051680848.
 Abrakadabrien, card game (Illustrations: Johannes Lott), Kosmos 2022.

Filmography

 2020: The Kangaroo Chronicles, German: Die Känguru-Chroniken, writer
 2022: The Kangaroo Conspiracy, German: Die Känguru-Verschwörung, writer and director

Awards (selection)

2006
 Bielefelder Kabarettpreis 1. Preis
 Grazer Kleinkunstvogel
 Winner of the German National Poetry Slam competition (single)
 Münchner Kabarett Kaktus

2007
 Der Rostocker Koggenzieher in Gold
 Silberner Stuttgarter Besen
 Gewinner der deutschsprachigen Poetry-Slam-Meisterschaften (single)
 Fohlen von Niedersachsen

2010
 Förderpreis Mindener Stichling
 Deutscher Radiopreis in the Best Comedy category for Neues vom Känguru (together with the production team at Radio Fritz)

2011
 Bayerischer Kabarettpreis Senkrechtstarter-Preis

2012
 Deutscher Kleinkunstpreis in the Kleinkunst division

2013
 Deutscher Hörbuchpreis in the Best Audiobook / Best Entertainment category for Die Känguru-Chroniken. Live und ungekürzt

2018
 Hörbuch-Award: QualityLand (Platinum)
 Hörbuch-Award: Die Känguru-Chroniken (7x Gold)
 Hörbuch-Award: Das Känguru-Manifest (2x Platinum)
 Hörbuch-Award: Die Känguru-Offenbarung (2x Platinum)
 Hörbuch-Award: Die Känguru-Apokryphen (Gold)
 Deutscher Science Fiction Preis for QualityLand

2021
 Jonathan-Swift-Preis

References

External links

 
 November 2008 interview with Marc-Uwe Kling by Focus 
 Works by and about Marc-Uwe Kling in the catalogue of the German National Library

1982 births
Living people
Writers from Stuttgart
Mass media people from Stuttgart
Free University of Berlin alumni